The UK Indie Chart is a weekly chart that ranks the biggest-selling singles that are released on independent record labels in the United Kingdom. The chart is compiled by the Official Charts Company, and is based on both physical and digital single sales. During 2008, 27 singles reached number one.

The biggest-selling indie hit of the year was "Dance Wiv Me" by Dizzee Rascal & Calvin Harris, which was at the top of the UK Indie Chart for nine weeks and sold nearly 390,000 copies. The second biggest-selling indie song was "Chasing Pavements" by Adele, which was at number one for five weeks and sold over 280,000 during the year.

Four acts were able to top the indie chart with two different singles. They were: The Futureheads with "The Beginning of the Twist" and "Radio Heart", Travis with "J. Smith" and "Something Anything", The Last Shadow Puppets with "The Age of the Understatement" and "My Mistakes Were Made for You", and Oasis with "The Shock of the Lightning" and "I'm Outta Time".

Chart-topping singles from the 2008 UK Indie Chart also included "Bluebirds Flying High", written by British singer James Fox as Cardiff City F.C.'s official song for the 2008 FA Cup Final, and a new remix of the Guru Josh song "Infinity", which topped the UK Indie Chart and made number three on the UK Singles Chart.

Chart history

See also
List of UK Dance Chart number-one singles of 2008
List of UK Official Download Chart number-one singles of 2008
List of UK Rock Chart number-one singles of 2008
List of UK Singles Chart number ones of 2008

References
General

Specific

External links
Independent Singles Chart at the Official Charts Company

2008 in British music
United Kingdom Indie Singles
Indie 2008